ERT (eResearchTechnology, Inc.) is a global company specializing in clinical services and customizable medical devices to biopharmaceutical and healthcare organizations.  It offers centralized cardiac safety and respiratory efficacy services in drug development and also collects, analyzes and distributes electronic patient-reported outcomes (ePRO) in multiple modalities across all phases of clinical research. In November 2021, ERT re-branded and the company name was changed to Clario.

History

In 2008 ERT acquired Biosigna, a Munich-based company, which specialized in biomedical signal processing.

In 2009 ERT ended its foray into the electronic data capture (EDC) business as ERT sold its EDC division for approximately $2.025 million of OmniComm shares.

In 2010 ERT acquired the Research Services Division of the CareFusion Corporation. This nearly doubled the company in size and brought a new service line and enhancements to its two current service offerings; Respiratory Services, specializing in centralized spirometry, Multi-Mode ePRO for patient reported outcomes, and enhanced Cardiac Safety Solutions. Along with the acquisition, ERT now has the capability to design and construct their own clinical diagnostic devices from a manufacturing facility in Estenfeld, Germany.

In 2010, the then current CEO of ERT was replaced on an interim basis by Joel Morganroth, M.D.

In 2011 Jeffrey S. Litwin, M.D. was appointed ERT's new president and chief executive officer. Litwin joined ERT in 2000 as senior vice president and chief medical officer and was subsequently promoted in December 2005 to executive vice president and chief medical officer. Dr. Litwin oversaw ERT's global cardiac safety operations for seven years.

In May 2012, Biosigna was liquidized and the office in Munich was closed.

On July 3, 2012, ERT announced that Genstar Capital LLC of San Francisco acquired ERT in a take-private transaction valued at approximately $400 million.

On July 9, 2012, ERT acquired and merged with invivodata, a provider of ePRO (electronic patient-reported outcomes) services and consulting.

In November 2014 ERT acquired eClinical Insights (eCI), a provider of cloud-based clinical trials management software.

On February 27, 2015 ERT acquired PHT Corporation (PHT).

In March 2016 ERT was acquired by Nordic Capital, a private healthcare investment firm for about $1.8 Billion.

In December 2016 ERT acquired Exco InTouch, a provider of patient engagement, data capture and digital health solutions.

In May 2017 ERT acquired ImageIQ, clinical trial biomedical imaging and analysis company.

In September 2017 ERT acquired Biomedical Systems (BMS), a provider of imaging as well as cardiac safety and respiratory data collection solutions.

In December 2017 ERT acquired iCardiac Technologies, a global provider of centralized cardiac safety, respiratory, and electronic clinical outcome assessment (eCOA) solutions that accelerate clinical research.

In December 2020, ERT announced a merger with Bioclinica, a global clinical trial end-point solutions company. Joe Eazor will be the head of the new business.

In November 2021, following ERT and Bioclinica merger, the company renames as Clario.

Locations
Philadelphia, Pennsylvania (headquarters) 
Rochester, New York
Bridgewater, New Jersey
Pittsburgh, Pennsylvania
Peterborough, Cambridgeshire
Nottingham, UK
Estenfeld, Germany
Tokyo, Japan
Boston, Massachusetts
Geneva, Switzerland
Scotts Valley, California
Morrisville, North Carolina
St. Louis, Missouri
Cleveland, Ohio
Brussels, Belgium
Pondicherry, India
Sofia, Bulgaria

References

External links
 ERT’s History Overview
 Reuters Company Profile ERES, ERT 
 European Pharmaceutical review EOA press release

Companies based in Philadelphia
Health care companies established in 1972
Contract research organizations